The Philippine dwarf kingfisher (Ceyx melanurus) is a species of bird in the family Alcedinidae that is endemic to the Philippines found in the islands of Luzon,  Polillo Islands, Catanduanes, Basilan, Samar, Leyte and Mindanao. Its natural habitat is tropical moist lowland forests. But it is threatened by habitat loss.

Taxonomy and Description

The Philippine dwarf kingfisher is a small mostly orange kingfisher with a red beak and legs, and a white belly.  It has a light lilac hue which is more intense in the southern subspecies and has dark blue spotted wings for the northern subspecies.

The Philippine kingfisher was formally described by the German naturalist Johann Jakob Kaup in 1848 under the binomial name Alcedo melanura. The specific epithet is from the Ancient Greek melanouros meaning "with a black tail". The Philippine dwarf kingfisher is now placed in the genus Ceyx that was introduced by the French naturalist Bernard Germain de Lacépède in 1799.

Subspecies 
Three subspecies are recognised:
 C. m. melanurus (Kaup, 1848) – Luzon, Polillo, Alabat and Catanduanes (north Philippines)
 C. m. samarensis Steere, 1890 – Samar and Leyte (east central Philippines)
 C. m. mindanensis Steere, 1890 – Mindanao and Basilan (south Philippines)

The subspecies C. m. mindanensis is sometimes treated as a separate species, the south Philippine dwarf kingfisher (Ceyx mindanensis), with the nominate and samarensis classified by the Handbook of the Birds of the World as the north Philippine dwarf kingfisher. The two proposed species are differentiated by color and size: north Philippine dwarf kingfishers have dark blue spotted wings and ears and are slightly smaller than south Philippine dwarf kingfishers, which have a more noticeable lilac hue and are overall more uniform orange.

In March 2020 a fledgling of the C. m. mindanensis subspecies was photographed for the first time by the Robert S. Kennedy Conservation Society led by Miguel David De Leon in Cagayan de Oro.

Habitat and Conservation Status 
It is found in  lowland primary and secondary forest up to 750 meters above sea level. It prefers areas with high rainfall.

The IUCN Red List follows the Handbook of the Birds of the World thus assesses the North and South subspecies separately. Both species or subspecies have been assessed as vulnerable with the population believed to be on the decline. The Southern subspecies has a lower estimated population of 2,500 to 9,999 mature individuals with the Northern subspecies estimated at 10,000 - 19,999. This species' main threat is habitat loss with wholesale clearance of forest habitats as a result of logging, agricultural conversion and mining activities occurring within the range.

There are currently no targeted conservation plans for the species. It occurs in a few protected areas throughout its range like the Northern Sierra Madre Natural Park, Bataan National Park, Samar Island Natural Park, Mount Kitanglad National Park but protection and enforcement from loggers and hunters is still lax.

References

External links

"How an Eye Surgeon Got a Picture of This Rare Pastel Bird"
BirdLife Species Factsheet

Philippine dwarf kingfisher
Endemic birds of the Philippines
Philippine dwarf kingfisher
Philippine dwarf kingfisher
Taxonomy articles created by Polbot